Times is the debut studio album by English singer-songwriter SG Lewis. It was released on 19 February 2021 by Virgin EMI and PMR Records. It features guest appearances from Rhye, Lucky Daye, Nile Rodgers, Frances, Robyn, Channel Tres and Lastlings.

Background 
SG Lewis announced Times through his social media accounts on 27 October 2020. With the announcement, he said:

Five singles from Times were released prior to the release of the album; "Chemicals", "Impact", "Feed the Fire", "Time" and "One More".

Composition 
Times is a disco album with dance-pop, house, chillwave, electropop and funk influences.

Critical reception 

At Metacritic, which assigns a normalised score out of 100 to critic ratings from publications, the album received an average score of 75 based on 6 reviews, indicating a "generally favourable" response.

Alexis Petridis of The Guardian gave Times a rating of 4 out of 5 stars, and wrote that "Lewis is really skilled at producing disco-infused pop-house" and that his "talent lies in [adding] subtle touches." Writing for NME, Ben Jolley gave the same rating, describing the album as "an incredibly cohesive collection of slide-across-the-kitchen-floor dance-pop bangers that encourage you to hold on to the good times." Dani Blum of Pitchfork praised the album as a "pristine" one made of "frictionless bangers", but noted that the songs are "so controlled that they never come close to catharsis."

Year-end lists

Track listing

Personnel 
Credits adapted from Tidal.

Musicians

 SG Lewis – vocals , bass , drums , programming , synthesizer , bass programming , keyboards 
 Julian Bunetta – drums , strings , synthesizer , programming 
 Totally Enormous Extinct Dinosaurs – piano , drum programming , synthesizer 
 Rhye – vocals 
 Matt Johnson – keyboards 
 Simon Hale – string arrangement, strings 
 Lucky Daye – vocals 
 Finlay Robson – bass , keyboards 
 Jay Moon – flute 
 John Ryan – bass 
 Nile Rodgers – guitar 
 Frances – keyboards , vocals 
 Chad Hugo – synthesizer 
 Channel Tres – vocals 
 Robyn – vocals 
 Joshua Dowdle – drums, synthesizer 
 Amy Dowdle – vocals 

Technical

 Stuart Hawkes – mastering engineer 
 Mike Marsh – mastering engineer 
 Matt Colton – mastering engineer 
 Nathan Boddy – mixer , mastering engineer 
 SG Lewis – mixer , recording engineer 
 Mark "Spike" Stent – mixer 
 Tristan Hoogland – recording engineer 
 Ludvig Larsson – recording engineer 
 Totally Enormous Extinct Dinosaurs – recording engineer 
 Peter Geiser – vocal engineer 
 Michael Freeman – assistant mixer

Charts

Weekly charts

Year-end charts

Release history

References

2021 debut albums
SG Lewis albums
Albums produced by Chad Hugo
Albums produced by Nile Rodgers
Albums produced by SG Lewis
Albums produced by Totally Enormous Extinct Dinosaurs
PMR Records albums
Virgin EMI Records albums